Sundholm may refer to:
Steve Sundholm (born June 5, 1974), American record producer
Karl Sundholm (1885–1955), Swedish rower